Herbert is a Germanic given name, from harja- "army", "warrior" or "noble, sublime", and beraht "bright" or "shining" (compare Robert). See also Heribert and Aribert, other given names with the same roots.

People named Herbert
Saint Herbert
Herbert of Derwentwater (died 687), Anglo-Saxon hermit, priest, and saint
Herbert I of Maine (died 1036), Frankish count
Herbert II of Maine (died 1062), Frankish count
Herbert I, Count of Vermandois (848–907), Frankish count
Herbert II, Count of Vermandois (880–943), Frankish count
Herbert III, Count of Vermandois (987–997), Frankish count
Herbert IV, Count of Vermandois (1045–1080), Frankish count
Herbert Aptheker (1915–2003), American historian
Herbert H. Asquith (1852–1928), leader of the Liberal Party and UK Prime Minister during World War I
Herbert Austin (1866–1941), English car maker, founder of the Austin Motor Company and Member of Parliament
Herbert Backe (1896–1947), German politician and SS functionary during the Nazi era
Herbert Baker (1862–1946), British architect
Herbert Bayer (1900–1985), Austrian graphic designer
Herbert von Bismarck (1849–1904), German diplomat
Herbert Brede (1888–1942), Estonian general
Herbert J. Brees (1877–1958), lieutenant in the United States Army
Herbert C. Brown (1912–2004), American chemist
Herbert Brownell Jr. (1904–1996), American politician
Herbert Ashwin Budd (1881–1950), British painter
Herbert Butterfield (1900–1979), British historian
Herbert Chabot (1931–2022), judge of the United States Tax Court
Herbert Clemens (born 1939), American mathematician
Herbert Cohen (born 1940), American Olympic fencer
Herbert Croly (1869–1930), American writer
Herbert Cukurs (1900–1965), Latvian aviator, member of the Arajs Kommando, which was involved in the Holocaust
Herbert von Dirksen (1882–1955), German diplomat and last German Ambassador to the United Kingdom before World War II
Herbert Henry Dow (1866–1930), Canadian-born American industrialist
Herbert Dreilich (1942–2004), German singer 
Herbert Elliott (1887–1973), English cricketer
Herbert Flam (1928–1980), American tennis player
Herbert W. Franke (1927–2022), Austrian writer
Herbert Gelernter (1930–2015), American scientist
Herbert Giles (1845–1935), British diplomat and translator
Herbert Gold (born 1924), American novelist
Herbert Gould (1891–1918),
Herbert Grönemeyer (born 1956), German actor and musician
Herbert Gross (1929–2020), American mathematician
Herbert Hagen, SS-Sturmbannführer of Nazi Germany and a personal assistant to the SS police chief in France
Herbert Hauptman (1917–2011), American mathematician
Herbert Hirche (1910–2002), German architect and designer
Herbert Hoover (1874–1964), American politician, 31st President of the United States, engineer, humanitarian and one of the principal commanders of United States occupation of Haiti
Herbert Hoover Jr. (1903–1969), American engineer, businessman, and politician, eldest son of the 31st U.S. president
Herbert N. Houck (1915–2002), American Naval flying ace awarded three Navy Crosses during World War II
Herbert Howells (1892–1983), English composer, organist and teacher famous for his Anglican church music
Herbert Eric Jansz (1890-1976), Sri Lankan Burgher civil servant
Herbert C. Jones (1918–1941), officer in the United States Navy who was posthumously awarded the Medal of Honor for his actions during the attack on Pearl Harbor
Herbert Kappler (1907–1978), Nazi German SS officer and head of German police and security services in Rome
Herbert von Karajan (1908–1989), Austrian conductor
Herbert Buckingham Khaury (1932–1996), musician known as Tiny Tim
Herbert Kitchener, 1st Earl Kitchener (1850–1916), British First World War field marshal and colonial administrator, one of the principal commanders in the Mahdist War and the Second Boer War
Herbert Kohler Jr. (1939–2022), American businessman
Herbert Lange (1909–1945), German Nazi SS officer and Holocaust perpetrator
Herbert Lawrence (1861–1943), general in the British Army, one of the principal commanders of Battle of Romani
Herbert Loch (1886–1976), German general in the Wehrmacht during World War II
Herbert Lom (1917–2012), Czech actor
Herbert Lumsden (1897–1945), senior British Army officer of World War I and II
Herbert Marcuse (1898–1979), German philosopher
Herbert Marshall (1890–1966), English actor
Herbert McCabe (1926–2001), English-born Irish Dominican priest, theologian, and philosopher
Herbert Morrison (1888–1965), British politician
Herbert Mullin (1947–2022), American serial killer and mass murderer
Herbert "Bert" Pitman (1877–1961), English Merchant Navy sailor, who was the Third Principal Commanding Officer of Titanic
Herbert Plumer, 1st Viscount Plumer (1857–1932), senior British Army officer of the First World War
Herbert L. Pratt (1871–1945), American oil industrialist
Herbert Irving Preston (1876–1928), American Marine and Medal of Honor recipient
Herbert B. Powell (1903–1998), U.S. Army General and Commanding General of the U.S. Continental Army Command
Herbert Ross (1927–2001), American director
Herbert Saffir (1917–2007), American scientist
Herbert Charles Sanborn (1873–1967), American philosopher, academic, and one-time political candidate
Herbert Schwamborn (born 1973), Zimbabwean music producer
Herbert Schultze (1909–1987), German U-boat (submarine) commander of World War II
Herbert Seifert (1907–1996), German mathematician
Herbert M. Seneviratne (1925–1987), Sri Lankan Sinhala lyricist and actor
Herbert Clifford Serasinghe, Sri Lankan Sinhala physician
Herbert A. Simon (1916–2001), American political scientist
Herbert Spencer (1820–1903), English philosopher
Herbert Stevens IV (born 1987), American hip-hop recording artist who records under the name "Ab-Soul"
Herbert Stewart (1843–1885), British soldier
Herbert Streicher (1947–2013), also known as Harry Reems, American pornographic actor
Herbert Stothart (1885–1949), American composer
Herbert Tabor (1918–2020), American biochemist and physician-scientist
Herbert Tarr (1929–1993), American Jewish novelist and humorist
Herbert Tennekoon (1911–1979), Governor of the Central Bank of Sri Lanka from 1971 to 1979
Herbert Thambiah (1926–1992), 39th Chief Justice of Sri Lanka
Herbert Beerbohm Tree (1852–1917), English actor and theatre manager
Herbert Schutz (1937–2018), German-born Canadian philologist
Herbert J. Valentine (1917–1996), American Marine flying ace, Navy Cross recipient
Herbert Weerasinghe, Inspector-General of Sri Lanka Police from April 1985 to December 1985
Herbert Wehner (1906–1990), German politician 
Herbert Weiz (born 1924), East German politician
Herbert G. Wells (1866–1946), British writer, best remembered for his science fiction novels
Herbert Winful (born 1952), Ghanaian-American engineering professor
Herbert Zangs (1924–2003), German artist

Fictional characters
Herbert (Disney character)
Herbert P. Bear, a character from Club Penguin
Herbert Birdsfoot, a fictional Muppet character in the television series Sesame Street
Chief Herbert Dumbrowski, fictional character in T.U.F.F. Puppy
Herbert Garrison, a fictional character in the television series South Park
Herbert the Pervert, a fictional character in the television series Family Guy
Herbert West, a fictional character in H. P. Lovecraft's story "Herbert West: Reanimator" and the films based on it

See also
Herbert (surname) 
Aribert
Hébert
Herb (given name)
Herbart
Herbert (disambiguation)
Hubert (disambiguation)
Robert

References

Given names
Dutch masculine given names
English masculine given names
French masculine given names
German masculine given names
Polish masculine given names
Czech masculine given names
Slovak masculine given names
Slovene masculine given names
Croatian masculine given names
Swedish masculine given names